Chinese lantern may refer to:

A collapsible paper lantern or sky lantern in bright colours, primarily red but also other colours, used for decorative purposes, commonly painted with Chinese art and calligraphy motifs and used throughout East, South and Southeast Asia
Shrubs in the genus Abutilon:
Abutilon × hybridum
Abutilon pictum
The shrub or small tree Dichrostachys cinerea
The herbaceous plant Physalis alkekengi
The plant Quincula lobata
The Chinese lantern structure, a molecule containing two metal centers bridged by four bidentate ligands
The Schwarz lantern, a geometric construction serving as an example in defining area of surface.